FC Naftokhimik Kremenchuk is a Ukrainian amateur football club from Kremenchuk, Poltava Oblast. It plays in the Poltava Oblast Championship (season 2017–18).

League and cup history

{|class="wikitable"
|-bgcolor="#efefef"
! Season
! Div.
! Pos.
! Pl.
! W
! D
! L
! GS
! GA
! P
!Domestic Cup
!colspan=2|Europe
!Notes
|-
|align=center|1992–93
|align=center|4th
|align=center bgcolor=gold|1
|align=center|34
|align=center|21
|align=center|10
|align=center|3
|align=center|56
|align=center|26
|align=center|52
|align=center|1/64 finals
|align=center|
|align=center|
|align=center bgcolor=green|Promoted
|-
|align=center|1993–94
|align=center|3rd
|align=center|4
|align=center|42
|align=center|24
|align=center|7
|align=center|11
|align=center|69
|align=center|41
|align=center|55
|align=center|1/16 finals
|align=center|
|align=center|
|align=center bgcolor=green|Promoted
|-
|align=center|1994–95
|align=center|2nd
|align=center|16
|align=center|42
|align=center|14
|align=center|10
|align=center|18
|align=center|50
|align=center|50
|align=center|52
|align=center|1/32 finals
|align=center|
|align=center|
|align=center|
|-
|align=center|1995–96
|align=center|2nd
|align=center|15
|align=center|42
|align=center|16
|align=center|7
|align=center|19
|align=center|43
|align=center|45
|align=center|55
|align=center|1/16 finals
|align=center|
|align=center|
|align=center bgcolor=red|Folded|
|-
|}

Poltava Oblast champion (1992), Poltava Oblast cup winner (1992, 1993).

See also
 Mykhailo Byelykh

References

 
Naftokhimik Kremenchuk, FC
Association football clubs established in 1991
1991 establishments in Ukraine
Naftokhimik